Hugo Sánchez Bonilla (born February 1, 1940 in Heredia, Costa Rica) is an artist.

Career
Sánchez taught at the University of Central America (UACA).  Since 1984 he has continued to teach at his personal art school.

Individual shows
1977 La Nación Main Hall
1978 Costa Rica Country Club.
1978 Surgeons and Doctors Association Board.
1980 Kamakiri Gallery
1983 Enrique Echandi Gallery
1991 Heredia City Hall
2001 Club Union

He has participated in over 170 group artshows in Costa Rica, El Salvador, Spain, Germany, Venezuela, Brazil, United States, France, Colombia, England and Tokyo.

Awards
1972 First Prize: Latin American reform for penitentiary system symposium.
1978 Honor Certificate for Annual Watercolor Hall of the Costa Rican Art Museum
1979 First Prize: Oil paint, Heredian painters contest, sponsored by Max Jimenez association (painting: "un amigo").
1979 First Prize: National Association of professors' contest. (painting: "los canasteros" -native bags hand crafters-)
1982 Honor Certificate for the Chinese Culture contest with the painting "bodegon"
1982 Silver Medal for the Second Watercolor Art show Margarita Berthau.  (painting: "exterior" -owned by the Costa Rican Art Museum)
1982 Honor Certificate for the National Insurance Company 60th anniversary contest. (painting: "psicosis")
1985 Gold Medal for the Costa Rican Institute of Tourism 30th anniversary. (painting: "callejón" -the ally- )
1994 Gold Medal for Pfizer Grand Prize "Costa Rican Watercolor 5th homenage". (painting: "entrada" -entrance-)
1996 "The Best of the Year Award", granted by Costa Rican Government, for his personal add and his art school work.
1996 Double Honor Certificate for the Pfizer Grand Prize "Costa Rican Watercolor 7th Homenage" (paintings: "interior" and "exterior" -intaglio technique)

References

1940 births
Living people
Costa Rican painters
People from Heredia Province
Academic staff of Central American University
Costa Rican expatriates in El Salvador